Yatabaré is a surname. Notable people with the surname include:

Mustapha Yatabaré (born 1986), Malian-French footballer, brother of Sambou
Sambou Yatabaré (born 1989), Malian footballer

Surnames of African origin